Christa Deanne Harmotto Dietzen (born October 12, 1986) is an American former professional volleyball player who played as a middle blocker for the United States women's national volleyball team. She played college volleyball for the Penn State women's volleyball team, and won back to back national championships in 2007 and 2008. Harmotto won gold with the national team at the 2014 World Championship, silver at the 2012 London Summer Olympics, and bronze at the 2015 World Cup and 2016 Rio Olympic Games.

High school and early life
Christa Harmotto was born in Sewickley, Pennsylvania and attended Hopewell High School in Aliquippa, where she was a three-year letterwinner in volleyball and two-year letterwinner in basketball.

As a high school senior in 2004, she was named the Pennsylvania State Gatorade Player of the Year and was also an All-American. She was a member of the 2004 USA Women's Junior National Team that won the NORCECA Championship in Winnipeg, Manitoba, Canada and was also selected to the 2005 USA Junior National Team that competed in Ankara, Turkey, at the FIVB Under-20 World Championships.

She set a school record 183 blocks in her junior year at Hopewell and in 2004–05 as a senior she set a school record for hitting percentage at .595. She led Hopewell to a No. 1 Pennsylvania ranking and also helped her squad to a 59–0 record against WPIAL opponents. She played club volleyball for Pittsburgh Renaissance that qualified for the Junior Olympics. Harmotto was considered a top 15 recruit for the class of 2005.

Penn State
Harmotto is a middle hitter and her kills are fast and hard to defend, which is why she had a .492 hitting percentage in 2007 and led the nation in hitting percentage for most of the season in 2008 with a .486 percentage. She is also known as one of the nations top blockers, as she had 200 blocks in 2007 and 166 in 2008.

Harmotto is an education major and was named ESPN The Magazine Academic All-American of the Year in 2008. She has also been named Academic All-Big Ten in 2006, 2007 and 2008. She says her goals after her Penn State career is over is to play internationally and go to the Olympics.

2005 (Freshman)
She set the Penn State record for blocks in a four-game match with 13 versus Southern California, and also led the team in blocking with 1.50 blocks per game. She recorded at least six kills in 28 of 29 matches she played in. Harmotto was on her way to becoming a first or second team All-American before she tore her ACL in the last home match of the Big Ten, thereby missing every NCAA match. Despite the season-ending injury, she was named an AVCA Honorable Mention All-American for her efforts and contributions in the regular season.

2006 (Sophomore)
Harmotto recovered from her injury, and posted an impressive sophomore campaign. She played in 111 of 114 games that the Nittany Lions played and ranked first on the team in blocks per game (1.58), second on the squad in hitting percentage (.405) and third on the team in kills per game (2.85). Her average of 1.58 blocks per game ranks tied for 10th on Penn State's all-time single-season record list, equaling Terri Zemaitis' 1997 mark. She had a career high 17 kills on .483 hitting in the win versus Minnesota en route to being named the conference player of the week. She helped Penn State to the NCAA Regional Final.

2007 (Junior)
As a junior, Harmotto had one of the most nationally recognized performances of the year. She was named the Big Ten Player of the Year, was an AVCA First team All-American, was a Honda Award nominee for volleyball as the top player in the country, and was considered a frontrunner for the National Player of the Year.

She played in 121 of Penn State's 122 games of the year and started all 36 matches. She finished the year with 375 kills on .492 hitting percentage, a percentage which ranks among the top five in NCAA history and also ranked first in the conference and second nationally. She had 200 blocks on the year and averaged 1.65 blocks per game, which tied for fifth in the nation and was second on the team. She equaled her career high of 17 kills with no errors to hit .444 against Wisconsin. She helped her squad to a 20–0 Big Ten record and a 34–2 record overall.

In NCAA play and helping her team win the 2007 NCAA national championship against top seeded Stanford, she was named to the NCAA Final Four All-Tournament Team after having 14 kills and hitting .435 in the championship match.

2008 (Senior)
Harmotto had an impressive senior year, leading the nation in hitting percentage from Sep 21 until the end of the season in December. She ended the year with a .486 percentage with 275 total kills. She also had 166 blocks for the season and finished the year third in the nation in blocks per set (1.47). Harmotto repeated as an AVCA First Team All-American and earned her second consecutive Honda Award nomination.

She helped Penn State to their second consecutive 20–0 Big Ten season, without dropping a single set to any teams. In the 2008 NCAA Tournament, she was named to the NCAA University Park Regional All-Tournament Team after helping her team advance to the NCAA Final Four after sweeping Western Michigan and California.

In the National Semifinals against Nebraska, Harmotto had 7 kills and 4 blocks. In the NCAA national championship against Stanford, Harmotto had 8 kills and 6 blocks to help Penn State to a 38–0 record and claimed their second consecutive NCAA Championship.

Harmotto ended her career with a .433 career hitting percentage – second best in NCAA history.

National team
Harmotto was selected to the U.S. National Team roster that traveled to Cairo, Egypt in April 2009. The U.S. team played two matches against the Egypt National Team. In the first match against Egypt, which USA won 3–1, Harmotto had a team high 18 points, including 16 kills with a 64 kill percent and .560 attack efficiency.

In May 2009, Harmotto began to train with the U.S. National Team. She participated in the 2009 Women's Pan-American Volleyball Cup in July, the 2009 FIVB World Grand Prix in August and the 2009 Final Four Intercontinental Cup in Lima, Peru in September. At the Final Four Cup, Harmotto was starter in all five matches. She averaged 0.95 blocks per set, totaled 19 blocks in five matches and was named the tournament's "Best Blocker". She helped Team USA to the gold medal match, where they lost to World No. 1 Brazil in four sets.

Harmotto was part of the USA national team that won the 2014 World Championship gold medal when the team defeated China 3-1 in the final match.

Awards

National team
 2009  Final Four Cup	
 2010  Pan-American Volleyball Cup 
 2010  FIVB World Grand Prix
 2011  Pan-American Volleyball Cup 
 2011  Women's NORCECA Volleyball Continental Championship
 2011  FIVB World Grand Prix		
 2012  FIVB World Grand Prix
 2012  Summer Olympics
 2013  FIVB World Grand Champions Cup	
 2013  Women's NORCECA Volleyball Continental Championship
 2014  FIVB World Championship 	
 2015  FIVB World Grand Prix	
 2015  FIVB Women's World Cup
 2015  Women's NORCECA Volleyball Continental Championship
 2016  Women's NORCECA Olympic Qualification Tournament
 2016  FIVB World Grand Prix
 2016  Summer Olympics

College

Four time AVCA All-American (2005–08)
Four time AVCA First Team All-Mideast Region (2005–08)
Four time First Team All-Big Ten (2005–08)
2008 Dapper Dan Sportswoman of the Year nominee
2008 Volleyball Magazine First Team All-American
2008 CVU National Blocker of the Year
2008 Honda Award nominee
2008 NCAA University Park Regional All-Tournament Team
2008 ESPN The Magazine Academic All-American of the Year
2008 ESPN The Magazine First Team Academic All-District
2008 Academic All-Big Ten
2008 Penn State Golden Volleyball for reaching 1,000 career kills
2008 Hampton Inn Penn State Classic All-Tournament Team
2008 Hawaiian Airlines Classic All-Tournament Team
2008 Nittany Lion Invitational All-Tournament Team
2008 Preseason All-Big Ten
2007 CVU National Player of the Year
2007 CVU National Blocker of the Year
2007 Big Ten Player of the Year
2007 Honda Award nominee
2007 Dapper Dan Sportswoman of the Year nominee
2007 NCAA Final Four All-Tournament Team
2007 Volleyball Magazine First Team All-American
2007 Volleyball Magazine Most Improved Player
2007 ESPN The Magazine Third Team Academic All-American
2007 ESPN The Magazine First Team Academic All-District
2007 Academic All-Big Ten
2007 University Park NCAA Regional All-Tournament Team
2007 Penn State Female Athlete of the Week (10/23, 11/26)
2007 Yale Classic All-Tournament Team
2007 Holiday Inn Downtown Husker All-Tournament Team
2007 Big Ten Player of the Week (8/27, 9/24, 10/15)
2007 Preseason All-Big Ten
2006 Big Ten Player of the Week (10/2)
2006 Volleyball Magazine second Team All-American
2006 Penn State Invitational All-Tournament Team
2006 LSU Classic All-Tournament Team
2006 Unanimous preseason All-Big Ten
2006 Academic All-Big Ten
2006 Penn State Classic All-Tournament Team
2005 Penn State Classic Most Valuable Player
2005 AVCA Showcase All-Tournament Team
2005 Big Ten All-Freshman Team

High school
Two time Prepvolleyball.com All-American (2004–05)
Two time Pittsburgh Post-Gazette Athlete of the Week
Two time Pittsburgh Tribune-Review Athlete of the Week
Two time first team all-state, all-WPIAL and all-section
2005 Mizuno First Team All-American
2005 Pennsylvania State Gatorade Player of the Year
2005 Prepvolleyball.com National Senior Player of the Year finalist
2005 Dapper Dan High School Female Athlete of the Year
2005 Pittsburgh Post-Gazette Female High School Athlete of the Year
2005 Beaver County Times Female Athlete of the Year
2005 Pittsburgh Tribune-Review Female Athlete of the Year
2005 Volleyball Magazine'' "Fab 50"

See also
Penn State Nittany Lions women's volleyball
List of Pennsylvania State University Olympians

References

External links
Christa Harmotto's official bio at USA Volleyball
Penn State bio
Harmotto's 2005 FIVB profile for Jr. National Team

1986 births
Living people
People from Sewickley, Pennsylvania
American women's volleyball players
Sportspeople from Pennsylvania
Volleyball players at the 2012 Summer Olympics
Penn State Nittany Lions women's volleyball players
Olympic silver medalists for the United States in volleyball
Medalists at the 2012 Summer Olympics
Middle blockers
Volleyball players at the 2016 Summer Olympics
Olympic bronze medalists for the United States in volleyball
Medalists at the 2016 Summer Olympics
Expatriate volleyball players in China
Expatriate volleyball players in Italy
Expatriate volleyball players in Turkey
American expatriate sportspeople in China
American expatriate sportspeople in Italy
American expatriate sportspeople in Turkey
Eczacıbaşı volleyball players
Fenerbahçe volleyballers